The 1884 United States presidential election in Ohio was held on November 4, 1884 as part of the 1884 United States presidential election. State voters chose 23 electors to the Electoral College, who voted for president and vice president.

Ohio was narrowly won by the Republican Party candidate, James G. Blaine, with 50.99% of the popular vote. The Democratic Party candidate, Grover Cleveland, garnered 46.94% of the popular vote.

Results

Results by county

See also
 United States presidential elections in Ohio

References

Ohio
1884
1884 Ohio elections